Harald Schmid (born 29 September 1957) is a retired German track and field athlete who competed in the sprints and hurdles. He was one of the best 400 metres hurdles runners in the world during his career.

Career
Schmid won bronze with the West German 4 × 400 m relay team at the 1976 Summer Olympics in Montreal as well as an individual bronze in the 400 m hurdles at the 1984 Summer Olympics in Los Angeles in 1984.

In addition, he won silver at the 1983 World Championships in the 400 m hurdles and the 4 × 400 m relay and a further bronze in 400 m hurdles at the 1987 World Championships. At the latter, he finished only 0.02 s behind the gold medalist Edwin Moses; Schmid's duels with Moses during the late 1970s and early 1980s were famous and Schmid was the last person to beat Moses before his streak of 122 consecutive victories. Moses said of him: "I would wake up at the morning, and in California we’re about nine hours behind Germany. I’d say to myself, ‘Harald has probably finished his workout by now, I need to get busy!’ Guys like him were my motivation."

Schmid also won gold at the European Championships 5 times (3 individual and 2 team medals) and one silver with the team.

His personal best in the 400 m hurdles was 47.48 s (achieved twice: in 1982 and at the World Championships in 1987), which at one point was the European record and the second fastest time ever.

In 2016, he was inducted into Germany's Sports Hall of Fame.

Personal life
Schmid has a PhD in Sports Science and was appointed to the IAAF athletes commission in 1999. He participates actively in anti-drug campaigns and encourages children's sport activities.

References

External links
 
 Harald Schmid's public relations company
 400 m Hurdles, Rom 1987 (ESPN).

Living people
1957 births
West German male sprinters
West German male hurdlers
Olympic athletes of West Germany
Olympic bronze medalists for West Germany
Athletes (track and field) at the 1976 Summer Olympics
Athletes (track and field) at the 1984 Summer Olympics
Athletes (track and field) at the 1988 Summer Olympics
World Athletics Championships athletes for West Germany
World Athletics Championships medalists
European Athletics Championships medalists
Recipients of the Cross of the Order of Merit of the Federal Republic of Germany
Medalists at the 1984 Summer Olympics
Medalists at the 1976 Summer Olympics
Olympic bronze medalists in athletics (track and field)
Universiade medalists in athletics (track and field)
Universiade gold medalists for West Germany
Medalists at the 1979 Summer Universiade
Sportspeople from Hanau